James Troy Archer (January 16, 1955 – June 22, 1979) was an American football defensive tackle who played three seasons in the National Football League (NFL) for the New York Giants. He began playing football at age six after his father forged his birth certificate to show he was eight years old.

He played football at California High School in Whittier, California where he was smaller in stature than would be expected from a professional football player.  After high school, he grew significantly while playing college football at Rio Hondo College and the University of Colorado, Boulder.

A resident of Guttenberg, New Jersey, Archer was killed in an auto accident during training camp.

References

1955 births
1979 deaths
Sportspeople from Glendale, California
People from Guttenberg, New Jersey
American football defensive tackles
Colorado Buffaloes football players
New York Giants players
Road incident deaths in New Jersey